The Sexual Orientation and Gender Identity Expression (SOGIE) Equality Bill, also known as the Anti-Discrimination Bill (ADB), is a series of House and Senate bills that were introduced in the 17th, 18th, and 19th Congress of the Philippines, which aims to set into law measures to prevent various economic and public accommodation-related acts of discrimination against people based on their sexual orientation, gender identity, or expression.

Legislative history

Prior to the 17th Congress
A senate bill against discrimination on the basis of sexual orientation and gender identity was believed to have been first filed under the 11th Congress of the Philippines in 2000 by then-Senator Miriam Defensor-Santiago. On July 26, 2004, under the 13th Congress of the Philippines, Senator Defensor-Santiago filed the Employment Non-Discrimination bill which aims to prohibit employment discrimination on the basis of sexual orientation. Similar bills were refiled by her on the 14th (Anti-Discrimination bill of 2007) and 15th congress (Anti-Sexual Orientation Discrimination bill).

In the House of Representatives, counterpart house bills were filed continuously by the representatives of Akbayan party-list starting with House Bill 634 filed during the 13th Congress of the Philippines on July 1, 2004, by then party-list Representative Etta Rosales.

Similar measures continued to be filed by other senators during the 13th to 16th Congress but none have been successful. Example provided below are the first anti-discrimination senate bills from their respective congress:
13th Congress - Senate Bill 165 (Employment Non-Discrimination bill of 2004)
14th Congress - Senate Bill 11 (Anti-Gender Discrimination bill)
15th Congress - Senate Bill 1559 (Anti-Sexual Orientation Discrimination bill)
16th Congress - Senate Bill 1022 (Anti-Discrimination bill)

17th Congress
In 2017, the first SOGI house bill of the 17th Congress was filed by Dinagat Islands Representative Arlene Bag-ao under House Bill 51. Similar bills were filed by Bataan Representative Geraldine Roman (HB 267), Akbayan Representative Tomas Villarin (HB 3555), and other representatives. These bills were consolidated and substituted by House Bill 4982. HB 4982 made history when it was approved on the third and final reading with no members of the House of Representatives in opposition, becoming the first Anti-Discrimination Bill that was approved in the House of Representatives.

The counterpart bill in the Senate, filed by Senator Risa Hontiveros (the first Akbayan senator), was in the period of interpolations by May 2018. It was backed by Senators Loren Legarda, Grace Poe, Nancy Binay, Franklin Drilon, Bam Aquino, Chiz Escudero, Ralph Recto, Sonny Angara, JV Ejercito, Francis Pangilinan, Juan Miguel Zubiri, and Leila de Lima, although de Lima was barred from voting on the bill as she is currently in police custody. It was opposed by Senators Tito Sotto, Manny Pacquiao, Cynthia Villar, and Joel Villanueva (who signed up as a co-author of the bill). Other senators such as Win Gatchalian, Koko Pimentel, Antonio Trillanes, Panfilo Lacson, and Richard J. Gordon did not express their support or rejection of the bill. Additionally, Alan Peter Cayetano and Gregorio Honasan lost their voting rights on Senate measures as they declined to be part of the presidential cabinet. Out of the existing 24 Senate seats: 12 seats could vote and were in support of the bill, 1 seat was in support but could not vote on the bill, 4 seats could vote and were in opposition to the bill, 5 seats could vote on the bill but have not yet given their positions on it , and 2 seats were de facto vacated. For a bill to have passed the Senate, it needed more than half the votes in favor of it from all 24 Senate seats. The SOGIE Equality Bill was supported by 12 seats that were allowed to vote on the measure.

The bill is also supported by the Catholic student governments of University of the Philippines-Diliman (UPD), Ateneo de Manila University (ADMU), De La Salle University (DLSU)-Manila, De La Salle - College of St. Benilde (CSB), Far Eastern University (FEU), Miriam College (MC), St. Scholastica's College (SSC)-Manila and San Beda University (SBU). The longest running LGBT student organization, UP Babaylan, has also been supporting the bill ever since it was first filed, as well as known celebrities and icons such as Heart Evangelista, Nadine Lustre, Bianca Gonzalez, Iza Calzado, Charo Santos-Concio, Dingdong Dantes, Joey Mead King, Divine Lee, Karen Davila, Chot Reyes, Tootsy Angara, BJ Pascual, Samantha Lee, Christine Bersola-Babao, Rajo Laurel, Tim Yap, Anne Curtis, Mari Jasmine, Laureen Uy, Pia Wurtzbach, Lorenzo Tañada III, Vice Ganda, Arnold Van Opstal, and Chel Diokno.

In March 2018, a small group of Christians protested at the Senate against the SOGIE bill by calling the proposed legislation an "abomination", adding that homosexuality is a "sin" citing that their hate is justified because it is written in the Bible and that identifying as part of the LGBT community is a lifestyle. The group also claimed that the bill relates to same-sex marriage, which is not found anywhere within the bill. Senators Villanueva, Gatchalian, and Villar spoke against same-sex marriage after the protest. In May 2018, Senator Tito Sotto, who opposes the SOGIE bill, became the new Senate President. In an interview, Sotto was asked on the bill's passage, to which he responded, "Not in this congress."

In July 2018, various high-profile celebrities rallied for the passage of the SOGIE bill. They also called out senators Sotto, Pacquiao, and Villanueva to end the debates and pass the proposed legislation. In August 2018, at the height of the bill's postponed debates, various discrimination incidents against the Filipino LGBT community surfaced, causing public calling for the passage of the SOGIE Equality Bill in the Senate. Numerous influential personalities, including political allies of the three senators who oppose the bill, sided with the calls to pass the landmark proposal.

In May 2019, the SOGIE Equality Bill officially became the longest-running bill under the Senate interpellation period in Philippine history. Supporters of the bill have remarked that the prolonged interpellation was intended by the dissenters to block the passage of the historic anti-discrimination bill. The bill's principal author and sponsor in the Senate, Senator Risa Hontiveros, called on her Senate colleagues to formally close the question period so that the bill can be open for amendments and voting. In June 2019, with the end of the session of the 17th Congress, the SOGIE Equality Bill prohibiting discrimination on the basis of sexual orientation, gender identity or expression—after the lawmakers failed to tackle the bill in this session of the Senate of the Philippines. The Senate version of the bill was first filed on August 11, 2016. It was sponsored by Risa Hontiveros on December 14 of the same year. The bill has become one of the slowest-moving bills in the country's history. The passed House version of the bill would have penalised discrimination with a fine of not less than ₱100,000 but not more than ₱500,000, or imprisonment of not less than one year but not more than six years or both, depending on the court's decision. However, she said the bill had gained new allies and wider acceptance among policy makers and the public and that she is confident the bill will pass in the next Congress. The bill was archived, and the bill must be refiled in the 18th Congress, restarting the one to three-year process of enactment.

18th Congress
Versions of the SOGIE Equality Bill were refiled in the 18th Congress by Senators Risa Hontiveros, Leila de Lima, Francis Pangilinan, and Imee Marcos although she is against divorce and same sex marriage stating that it is "too complicated". Another similar bill was filed by Senator Sonny Angara. Senators Bong Go, Migz Zubiri, Ralph Recto, and Franklin Drilon announced their support for the SOGIE Bill. In the House of Representatives, various representatives also filed their versions of the bill, notably, Sol Aragones of Laguna, Geraldine Roman of Bataan, Loren Legarda of Antique, Maria Lourdes Alba of Bukidnon, Jose Belmonte of Quezon City, Bayan Muna representatives Eufemia Cullamat, Carlos Zarate, and Ferdinand Gaite, Kristine Singson of Ilocos Sur, Bagong Henerasyon representative Bernadette Dy, Eric Olivarez of Parañaque, and Francis Abaya of Cavite. Representatives Sy-Alvarado, De Venecia, Reyes, Taduran, Bordado, Olivarez, and Violago have also signed as co-author of the bill filed by representative Roman, while Gabriela Women's Party representative Arlene Brosas has signed as co-author of the bill filed by Bayan Muna.

Religious leaders also gave their support for the SOGIE Bill, such as Koko Alviar of the Iglesia Filipina Independiente (Aglipayan Church), Sister Mary John Mananzan, OSB, executive director of the Institute of Women's Studies of the Catholic St. Scholastica's College, Bishop Solito Toquiero of the National Council of Churches in the Philippines, and Pastor Kakay Pamaran of the Union Theological Seminary. In contrast, representative Eddie Villanueva claimed that the SOGIE Bill is 'imported' and not part of Filipino culture.

Senate president Tito Sotto expressed dissent against the bill again, adding that the bill "will not pass" in the Senate as long as he is the Senate president. Senator Joel Villanueva also expressed dissent.

Various personalities announced their support for the SOGIE Bill, namely: Anne Curtis, Heart Evangelista, Catriona Gray, Pia Wurtzbach, Judy Taguiwalo, Iza Calzado, Nadine Lustre, Janine Gutierrez, BJ Pascual, Mari Jasmine, and Samantha Lee. Vice President Leni Robredo also supported the SOGIE Bill, while President Rodrigo Duterte supported "an anti-discrimination law patterned like the one approved in Davao". The government has stated that they will not certify an anti-discrimination bill as "urgent". In September 2020, groups again called to pass the SOGIE bill after President Duterte gave an absolute pardon to a former US Marine who has been convicted of homicide in relation to the killing of trans Filipina Jennifer Laude.

19th Congress 
The SOGIE Equality bill was refiled in the 19th Congress by Senators Risa Hontiveros, Loren Legarda, and Mark Villar in September 2022 with Senator Robin Padilla showing support for the bill. The bill passed the Senate committee on women, children, family relations, and gender equality in December 2022 with the support of 19 senators. Included in the signatories of the Senate committee report were Hontiveros, Senate president pro tempore Legarda, and Senate minority leader Koko Pimentel.

Senator majority leader Joel Villanueva reverted the bill to the committee level after he referred the bill to the committee on rules in February 2023, which delayed sponsorship of the bill by the plenary. Villanueva and his father, Rep. Eddie Villanueva in the lower house of Congress, were accused of using underhanded tactics to delay or block discussions on the bill.

Musician and former National Youth Commission chair Ice Seguerra has expressed support for the bill.

An anti-SOGIE disinformation network was uncovered in a Rappler investigative report published in February 2023. According to data published by Rappler, the online network had been spreading disinformation about the bill since 2019.

See also
LGBT rights in the Philippines
Bakla

References

External links
 Committee Report and Full Text of House Bill No. 4982 (2017)

LGBT in the Philippines
LGBT-related legislation
Proposed laws of the Philippines
Anti-discrimination legislation
Transgender law